Għallis Battery, also known as Pondéves Battery, was an artillery battery in Magħtab, limits of Naxxar, Malta. It was built in 1715–1716 by the Order of Saint John as one of a series of coastal fortifications around the Maltese Islands. The battery has been mostly ruined, but some debris can still be seen.

History
Għallis Battery was built in 1715–1716 as part of the first building programme of coastal batteries in Malta. The nearest fortifications to the battery were Għallis Tower to the west and Qalet Marku Redoubt to the southeast (now demolished).

The battery had a semi-circular gun platform. It was to be surrounded by a ditch, but it was only partially excavated and was never completed.

In World War II, an emplacement was built on the remains of the blockhouse, possibly for a small field gun.

Present day
Today, very little remains of the battery survive. Part of one wall of the blockhouse still exists, the partially excavated ditch, and the general outline of the battery's foundations can also be seen.

References

External links
National Inventory of the Cultural Property of the Maltese Islands

Batteries in Malta
Hospitaller fortifications in Malta
Military installations established in 1715
Ruins in Malta
Naxxar
Limestone buildings in Malta
National Inventory of the Cultural Property of the Maltese Islands
18th-century fortifications
1715 establishments in Malta
18th Century military history of Malta